The secretary of the State of Connecticut is one of the constitutional officers of the U.S. state of Connecticut. (The definite article is part of the legal job title.) It is an elected position in the state government and has a term length of four years.

The current secretary of the state is Stephanie Thomas, a Democrat who has held the office since January 2023 after being successfully defeating Republican opponent Dominic Rapini in the 2022 General Election. 

The Secretary of the State's Office is composed of two divisions:
The Legislation and Elections Administration Division, which administers elections and ensures compliance with state and federal election laws. This division is also responsible for maintaining governmental records, administering the Seal of Connecticut, and licensing notaries public.
The Commercial Recording Division, which charters corporations and other business entities, registers trademarks, service marks, and liens under the Uniform Commercial Code, and issues apostilles.

List of secretaries of state of Connecticut

Before statehood

Since statehood
Connecticut ratified the United States Constitution and gained statehood in 1788.

See also
 Attorney General of Connecticut

References

External links
List of past Secretaries of the State of Connecticut, from the Connecticut State Library

 
1639 establishments in Connecticut